The 2002 Big League World Series took place from August 3–10 in Easley, South Carolina, United States. San Juan, Puerto Rico defeated Hughesville, Maryland in the championship game.

A mixed-pool format was introduced this year.

Teams

Results

Group A

Group B

Elimination Round

References

Big League World Series
Big League World Series